ToonMarty is an animated television series produced by Sardine Productions which first premiered on Teletoon in Canada, on May 1, 2017.

Plot
ToonMarty follows the adventures of Marty, the mascot of ToonMart who becomes alive when a billboard is hit by lightning. Together, he and his friends Burnie and Holly have fun in Toonville under the supervision of Marty's boss, Jack.

Characters

Main
 Marty (voiced by Brian Froud) is the mascot of ToonMart and its only employee.
 Burnie (voiced by Mike Patterson) is Marty's best friend, son of local supervillain Burnatron.
 Holly (voiced by Holly Gauthier-Frankel) is a female blue robot.
 Jack (voiced by Brett Schaenfield) is Marty's boss.

Recurring
 Suki (voiced by Erin Agostino) is Marty's love interest. She is a blue-haired anime magical girl.
 Carly is a cat whom resembles Hello Kitty.
 Burnatron is Toonville's local supervillain and Burnie's father.
 Super Simon is a superhero who saves Toonville.
 Chef and Chicken are Marty's favorite cartoon stars, the Ant & Aardvark-esque pair of a raging chef and a sassy chicken.
 Hobo Jeb is a curmudgeon vagabond dog. He resembles 1930s Rubberhose cartoons.
 Grizelda is a witch. 
 Punchy McKnuckles is Toonville's bully. 
 Lenny is a bench.
 Dr. Smarty Pants is a monkey doctor.

Episodes

Online game
An online game was available on Teletoon's website called Marty's Special Delivery.

References

2010s Canadian animated television series
2017 Canadian television series debuts
2017 Canadian television series endings
Canadian children's animated adventure television series
Canadian children's animated comedy television series
Canadian children's animated action television series
Canadian children's animated fantasy television series
Canadian flash animated television series
Animated television series about robots
English-language television shows
Teletoon original programming
2010s Canadian children's television series